Jack Kitching  was an English professional rugby league footballer who played in the 1940s and 1950s, and coached in the 1950s.

Early life
Kitching was born in Bradford. He was educated at Thornton Grammar School, Bradford and Borough Road College, London, where he qualified as a teacher. From 1940–45 he served in the Royal Navy.

Rugby career
Kitching's rugby league career started in 1944 when he signed for Bradford Northern, having previously played for Bradford rugby union club.

Kitching was three times a Challenge Cup winner.  He played in the second leg of the 1943–44 Challenge Cup final as Bradford beat Wigan 8–0 (winning 8–3 on aggregate) at Odsal Stadium on 22 April 1944. The second win was when Bradford beat Leeds 8–4 at Wembley Stadium in the 1946–47 Challenge Cup final on 3 May 1947. In between Kitching played in both legs of the 1944–45 Challenge Cup final as Bradford lost 13–9 on aggregate to Huddersfield. The third was in 1949 as Bradford beat Halifax 12–0 at Wembley on 7 May.

While at Bradford Kitching won four caps for England between 1945 and 1947, three caps against Wales (1945, 46 and 47) and a single cap against France in 1946. In 1946 he was selected for the Great Britain team to tour Australia and New Zealand, and played in one test against Australia. During the first test of the tour he was sent off for striking Australian captain, Joe Jorgenson. Kitching later accused Jorgensen of biting him prior to his dismissal, an allegation that was not sustained.

In June 1948 Kitching accepted an offer to become manager at new club, Whitehaven who were about to start their inaugural season in the league.  A transfer fee of £2,500 was agreed between Whitehaven and Bradford enabling Kitching to also play for as well as manage Whitehaven in July 1948; however in December of the same year Kitching resigned as manager citing personal reasons and the inability to find a family home in Whitehaven, and returned as a player to Bradford.  In October 1950 he was transferred to Castleford for a fee of £1,000.  From February 1951 he was captain of the team. Between August 1951 to April 1952, he was coach of the Castleford club.

Teaching career
Away from rugby Kitching taught geography and physical education.  At the time of the 1950 General Election he was teaching at Pudsey Grammar School.

Political career
He was the Liberal Party candidate for Bradford North at the 1950 General Election. He finished third and did not stand for parliament again.

References

1920s births
Year of death missing
Bradford Bulls players
British sportsperson-politicians
Castleford Tigers coaches
Castleford Tigers players
England national rugby league team players
English rugby league coaches
English rugby league players
Great Britain national rugby league team players
Liberal Party (UK) parliamentary candidates
Place of death missing
Royal Navy personnel of World War II
Rugby league centres
Whitehaven R.L.F.C. coaches
Whitehaven R.L.F.C. players
Schoolteachers from Yorkshire